Xanalıyan (also, Xanalyan and Khanalyan) is a village and municipality in the Masally Rayon of Azerbaijan.  It has a population of 1,127.

References 

Populated places in Masally District